Wendell is a town in Wake County, North Carolina, United States. It is a satellite town of Raleigh, the state capital.  The population was 5,845 at the 2010 census.

History
Incorporated in 1903, Wendell was settled in the 1850s, when farmers in Granville County were victims of a blight that came to be known as the Granville County Wilt. Their tobacco crops failed, and they chose to move to a new location with more fertile land for their crops.

As settlement increased, a small village took form. The villagers asked the local schoolteacher, M.A. Griffin, to choose a name. Griffin suggested they call it Wendell, in honor of his favorite poet, Oliver Wendell Holmes. However, the townspeople pronounce each syllable with equal emphasis, not as the poet's middle name is said. The Town seal was adopted on April 4, 1963.

The first post office was built in 1891, and has been restored by the Wendell Historical Society.  The oldest institution in Wendell is Hephzibah Baptist Church, founded in 1809.  The first newspaper was the Wendell Clarion, founded in 1911, which was succeeded by the Gold Leaf Farmer and currently the Eastern Wake News.

Wendell has four buildings and two districts that are listed on the National Register of Historic Places. These are the Dr. Thomas H. Avera House, Harmony Plantation, Riley Hill School, Sunnyside, Wendell Boulevard Historic District, and the Wendell Commercial Historic District:.

Geography

Wendell is located in the northeast-central region of North Carolina, where the Piedmont and Atlantic Coastal Plain regions meet. This area is known as the "Fall Line" because it marks the elevation inland at which rapids and small waterfalls begin to appear in creeks and rivers. Its central Piedmont location situates Wendell approximately two and a half hours (via car) west of Atlantic Beach, and four hours east of the Great Smoky Mountains.

Climate
Wendell enjoys a moderate subtropical climate, with moderate temperatures in the spring, fall, and winter. Summers are typically hot with high humidity. Winter highs generally range in the low 50s°F (10 to 13 °C) with lows in the low-to-mid 30s°F (-2 to 2 °C), although an occasional 60 °F (15 °C) or warmer winter day is not uncommon. Spring and fall days usually reach the low-to-mid 70s°F (low 20s°C), with lows at night in the lower 50s°F (10 to 14 °C). Summer daytime highs often reach the upper 80s to low 90s°F (29 to 35 °C). The rainiest months are July and August.

Government
Wendell's current mayor is Virginia Gray. She conducts Town Board of Commissioners meetings and only has a vote in the event of a tie. The administration of the town is conducted by the town manager. The board of commissioners includes Jason Joyner (Mayor Pro-tem), Joe DeLoach, Deans Eatman, Phil Tarnaski, and Jonathan M. Lutz.

Demographics

2020 census

As of the 2020 United States census, there were 9,793 people, 2,686 households, and 1,941 families residing in the town.

2010 census
As of the census of 2010, there were 5,845 people and 2,430 housing units. The population density was 1123.2 people per square mile. The racial makeup of the town was 58.1% White, 30.2% African American, 0.8% Native American, 0.9% Japanese, 0.01% Pacific Islander, 3.20% from other races, and 1.34% from two or more races. Hispanic or Latino of any race were 11.5% of the population.

As of the 2010 census, there were 2430 housing units, with 40% of units built before 1980.  Of the 2010 population, 55% were married.  29.5% had children under the age of 18 living with them, 11.6% were persons 65 years or older, 29% were between the ages of 25–44, and 30% were between the ages of 0–19. The median age in 2010 was 35.  The average household size was 2.12.

The median family income for a household in the town was $47,908, The per capita income for the town was $26,556. About 17.3% of the population was below the poverty line.

Education
The town is served by five public schools, which are administered by the Wake County Public School System. They include Lake Myra Elementary, Carver Elementary School, Wendell Elementary School, Wendell Middle School and East Wake High School.

The town is home to one institution of higher learning, Southeastern Free Will Baptist College.

Economy
Downtown Wendell houses many businesses; including the Bearded Bee Brewing Company and Daedong-USA, the maker of Kioti tractors.

Transportation

Passenger
 Air: Wendell is served by Raleigh-Durham International Airport, which is located in northwestern Wake County on I-40.
 Interstate highway: I-87 is the closest Interstate to Wendell and is located west of the town.
 Wendell was served by a passenger line between Raleigh and Wilson with stops in Knightdale, Zebulon, and Wendell, but was terminated in 1943. Wendell is not served directly by passenger trains.  The nearest Amtrak stations are in  Raleigh and Selma.
 Local bus: The Triangle Transit Authority operates buses that serve the region and connect to municipal bus systems in Raleigh, Durham, and Chapel Hill.

Roads
 The main highway in Wendell is US 64 which allows access to Raleigh and the North Carolina coast.
 Other highways in the area include US 264, NC 97, and NC 231.

Parks and recreation
The town is served by three recreational parks and facilities. They include Wendell Park, Wendell Community Center, and J. Ashley Wall Town Square.

Notable people
 Greg Ellis (born 1975), NFL defensive end and 2007 Pro Bowl selection
 George J. Laurer (1925–2019), inventor of the Universal Product Code
 Ron and Amy Shirley, reality television stars of Lizard Lick Towing
 Gregory Walcott (1928–2015), actor

Notable annual town events
 Harvest Festival: takes place annually in October
 International Food and Music Festival: held annually in September

References

External links

 Town of Wendell official website
 Wendell Chamber of Commerce
 Eastern Wake News, local newspaper
 The Grey Area newspaper, local newspaper

Populated places established in the 1850s
Towns in North Carolina
Towns in Wake County, North Carolina